Eddie Belmonte (born February 5, 1943, in Santurce, San Juan, Puerto Rico) is a retired jockey who competed at the highest levels in Thoroughbred horse racing in his native Puerto Rico and in the United States.

After much success riding in Puerto Rico, Eddie Belmonte came to the United States in the latter part of 1964 to compete at New York and area racetracks. He was the first Puerto Rican jockey to compete in the Kentucky Derby, riding Exhibitionist in the 1966 running of the American Classic. His crowning career achievement came as the jockey of Personality, winner of the 1970 Preakness Stakes and that year's Eclipse Award for American Horse of the Year.

In addition to riding in New York, Belmonte rode successfully at tracks in New Jersey, Florida, and California. On February 17, 1972, he rode five winners in a single day at Santa Anita Park in Arcadia, California. In October 1973, Belmonte traveled to Longchamp Racecourse in Paris, France to ride in the prestigious Prix de l'Arc de Triomphe. Aboard El Famoso, he finished out of the money.

Eddie Belmonte retired as a jockey in 1976 and later worked as a riding instructor and jockeys' agent. He attempted a comeback in 1977  but on April 18, after winning a race at Aqueduct Racetrack, Belmonte suddenly collapsed and fell from his horse. His collapse came about as a result of an effort to meet riding weight limits through a dieting process that brought rapid weight loss.

Selected other wins:
Queens County Handicap (1965)
Adirondack Stakes (1966, 1971)
Derby Trial Stakes (1966)
Gravesend Handicap (1966)
Santa Catalina Stakes (1966)
Jim Dandy Stakes (1967, 1973)
Lamplighter Stakes (1967)
Sport Page Handicap (1967)
Test Stakes (1967, 1969, 1970)
Bowling Green Handicap (1968)
Discovery Handicap (1968)
Red Smith Handicap (1968)
Stymie Handicap (1968)
Californian Stakes (1969)
Comely Stakes (1969)
Miss Woodford Stakes (1969)
San Felipe Stakes (1969)
Santa Ysabel Stakes (1969, 1971)
Saranac Stakes (1969)
Schuylerville Stakes (1969)
Arlington Classic (1970)
Display Handicap (1970)
Stuyvesant Handicap (1970)
Baldwin Stakes (1971)
San Gorgonio Handicap (1972)
San Gabriel Handicap (1972)
San Marcos Stakes (1972)
Santa Paula Stakes (1972)
Santa Ana Handicap (1973)
La Brea Stakes (1975)

References

1943 births
Living people
Puerto Rican jockeys
American jockeys
People from Santurce, Puerto Rico